Dactyloscopus crossotus, the bigeye stargazer, is a species of sand stargazer native to the coastal Atlantic waters of Florida, United States and from the Bahamas to Brazil where it prefers sandy beaches at depths of from , occasionally down to .  It buries itself in the sand to ambush prey, leaving only its eyes, mouth and nose exposed.  It can reach a maximum length of  TL.

References

crossotus
Taxa named by Edwin Chapin Starks
Fish described in 1913